TiJi is a French television channel for children aged three to six.

History 
Launched in 2000, TiJi was the first channel in France to specialize in programming for preschool-aged children. At launch, it broadcast between 5:30am and 9:00pm.

A strong increase in the audience of the channel was noted between December 2002 to June 2003, when its share of the preschool audience increased by 60%, reaching 0.8% total share. From 2002 to 2003, in houses and apartments with cable or satellite television, 43% of children aged 4-10 began viewing Tiji. 

In 2008, it extended its time to 12pm so international viewers could watch easier. The channel played a signoff bumper for French viewers at 9pm followed by a notice for parents that the channel ended at 12pm for international viewers. Programming would resume as normal until signing off again at midnight.

A Russian feed was launched in 2009, airing all programming dubbed into Russian. On January 31, 2022, a Kazakh audio track was added for the Russian feed of the channel, airing most of the channel's programs with voice-overs for the audience in Kazakhstan.

On 1 February 2019, M6 Group had entered negotiations with Lagardère Active to acquire their television pole, including TiJi, Gulli and Canal J.

On October 21, 2019, the logo's cloud remains the same but adds small changes, somewhat inspired by the current Canal J logo with also a new look and a new sound jingle.

Audience 
As of March 2009, TiJi was in the top five of thematic channels in France, with the audience share of 0.6%. It was also the second most popular channel among children after Canal J, with the audience share of 4% among children aged four to ten.

International channels

The channel is variously distributed in French (French-speaking Europe and Africa, overseas French territories, Lebanon and the Balkans), Portuguese, Russian and Kazakh.

Current channels

References

Further reading
Reviews

External links 
  (in French)
  (in Russian)

Television stations in France
Children's television networks
Lagardère Active
Television channels and stations established in 2000
Television channels in Russia
Preschool education television networks